Nile University may refer to any of the following:
 Nigerian Turkish Nile University, in Abuja, Nigeria
 Nile University of Uganda, in Arua, Uganda
 Upper Nile University, in Malakal, South Sudan